Krister Sørgård (born 20 April 1970) is a Norwegian cross-country skier who competed between 1991 and 2001. His best World Cup finish was second in a 50 km event in Norway in 1996.

At the FIS Nordic World Ski Championships 1993 in Falun, Sørgård finished 10th in the 10 km + 15 km combined pursuit and 12th in the 10 km events.

He moved to Hønefoss with his Wife Hanne sørgård. They have 4 kids together, Jonas, Emil, Jørgen and Emma.

Cross-country skiing results
All results are sourced from the International Ski Federation (FIS).

World Championships

World Cup

Season standings

Individual podiums

1 podium

Team podiums

 2 podiums

References

External links

1970 births
Living people
Norwegian male cross-country skiers